El Baile Alemán ("The German Dance" in Spanish) is a cover album by Señor Coconut y Su Conjunto which was released on 23 December 1999 on vinyl in the US and released on other formats and regions on 26 January 2000. It consists of Kraftwerk covers done in a Latin American style.

Although mostly note-for-note covers, some tracks add embellishments such as "cha-cha-chas", or minor changes to the song, like incorporating Latin Radio into the radio transmission in "Autobahn". The song "Home Computer" also has some lyrics from "It's More Fun to Compute" from the album Computer World.

"Tour de France" was released as a remixed single. The single release also includes vocal and instrumental cover versions of "Expo 2000", which are not included on the album.

Early copies of the album opened with "Showroom Dummies" and included a cover of "Radioactivity" as the second track. At the request of the original songwriters, "Radioactivity" was taken off the album. All subsequent issues of the album were resequenced, placing "Showroom Dummies" as the second track and inserting a spoken track "Introducción" at the start of the album.

Track listing
Adapted from CD liner notes.

Singles
Tour de France (Multicolor Recordings / EFA | EFA 56007-6 / MCR 107.3):
Tour de France (Radio Edit & Album Version)/ EXPO2000/ EXPO2000 (Instrumental)

Tour de France / Showroom Dummies (Multicolor Recordings / New State Recordings | NSERCD001):
Tour de France (Radio Edit & "Good Grooves' 501 Vocal Mix" & Video)/ Showroom Dummies (Radio Edit)

Personnel
Jorge González – vocals
Lisa Carbon – background vocals
Atom Heart – keyboards, producer
Argenis Brito – vocals
Ricardito Tambo – shaker, MIDI

References

2000 albums
Covers albums
Uwe Schmidt albums
Emperor Norton Records albums